Kalattiyur is a small village with hill views of Western Ghats, located in Karamadai Taluk in the district of Coimbatore, India. The major occupation of the people is agriculture and the major cultivation is curry leaves. The village is surrounded by many companies like Pricol, Salzer etc., which employ quite a few people. The Bhavani River is the nearest river to this place, and drinking water is piped from the river to supply the village.

Most of the people in this village speak Kannada as their mother tongue and a majority of the people belong to community Vokkaliga.

Population and education
The population of this village is equally distributed between men and women. The 2012 literacy rate of 69% is expected to reach 80% in 3 years.

Weather and climate conditions
Weather in Kalattiyur is moderate and cool. Humidity is low. Temperature ranges from 15 degree C to 33 degree C. Even in summer there is a cool breeze.

Transportation
The village is connected by roads and by rail to nearby towns. The nearest railway station is Karamadai railway station. The village is 2 km from Karamadai, 10 km from Mettupalayam, 23 km from Coimbatore, and 18 km from Annur.

Nearest schools and colleges
Govt higher secondary school (2 km)
Vidhya vikas School (1 km)
SRSI Matriculation school (5 km)
KTVR Knowledge Park for Engineering and Technology (4 km)
King college of Engineering (0.5 km)
Sree sakthi engineering college (3 km)

References
Ministry of Drinking Water and Sanitation, Government of India
Polling station list

Villages in Coimbatore district